The 7.5 cm Feldkanone 18 (7.5 cm FK 18) was a field gun used by Germany in World War II. It was designed to replace the 7.5 cm FK 16 nA, which was a World War I-era 7.7 cm FK 16 rebarreled in 75 mm during the early Thirties. The development of the FK 18 had a low priority and it was not until 1938 that the gun was issued to the Heer.

Design 
The FK 18 was significantly lighter than the older gun, but was otherwise an unimpressive weapon. It used a modern split trail carriage, with the rear section and spades folding upwards for travel. It used the typical German recoil system where the hydraulic buffer was housed in the cradle underneath the barrel and the hydro-pneumatic recuperator in a cylinder above the barrel. For some reason the FK 18 was unusually prone to bore damage from cartridge debris and the barrel had to be inspected after every shot to ensure that it was clear.

Notes

References 
 Engelmann, Joachim and Scheibert, Horst. Deutsche Artillerie 1934-1945: Eine Dokumentation in Text, Skizzen und Bildern: Ausrüstung, Gliederung, Ausbildung, Führung, Einsatz. Limburg/Lahn, Germany: C. A. Starke, 1974
 Gander, Terry and Chamberlain, Peter. Weapons of the Third Reich: An Encyclopedic Survey of All Small Arms, Artillery and Special Weapons of the German Land Forces 1939-1945. New York: Doubleday, 1979 
 Hogg, Ian V. German Artillery of World War Two. 2nd corrected edition. Mechanicsville, PA: Stackpole Books, 1997 

World War II field artillery
World War II artillery of Germany
75 mm artillery
Military equipment introduced in the 1930s